Thirsk and Malton was a constituency represented in the House of Commons of the UK Parliament between 1885 and 1983.  The constituency was revived in 2010.

History

Robin Turton was the Minister of Health (note head of department in that era) from December 1955 to January 1957.  He also became father of the House and was among the longest-serving MPs for a single constituency, representing his seat for 44 years and 9 months.

Boundaries
1918-1950: The Urban District of Malton, the Rural Districts of Easingwold, Flaxton, Helmsley, Kirkbymoorside, Malton, Thirsk, and Wath, and part of the Rural District of Pickering.

1950-1974: The Urban District of Malton, the Rural Districts of Bedale, Easingwold, Flaxton, Helmsley, Kirkbymoorside, Malton, Thirsk, and Wath, and part of the Rural District of Pickering.

1974-1983: The Urban District of Malton, and the Rural Districts of Bedale, Easingwold, Flaxton, Helmsley, Kirkbymoorside, Malton, Thirsk, and Wath.

Members of Parliament

Elections

Elections in the 1880s

Elections in the 1890s

Elections in the 1900s

Elections in the 1910s

General Election 1914–15:

Another General Election was required to take place before the end of 1915. The political parties had been making preparations for an election to take place and by July 1914, the following candidates had been selected; 
Unionist: Edmund Turton
Liberal: George Nicholls

Elections in the 1920s

Elections in the 1930s

Election in the 1940s
General Election 1939–40:

Another General Election was required to take place before the end of 1940. The political parties had been making preparations for an election to take place and by July 1939, the following candidates had been selected; 
Conservative: Robert Turton

Elections in the 1950s

Elections in the 1960s

Elections in the 1970s

See also
List of parliamentary constituencies in North Yorkshire

Notes and references
Notes 
  
References

Parliamentary constituencies in Yorkshire and the Humber (historic)
Constituencies of the Parliament of the United Kingdom established in 1885
Constituencies of the Parliament of the United Kingdom disestablished in 1983
Politics of North Yorkshire
Ryedale
Politics of the Borough of Scarborough
Hambleton District